Moeketsi Sekola (born 27 January 1989) is a South African footballer who plays as an attacker for Tshakhuma.

Career

Sekola started his career with South African third division side Roses United, helping them earn promotion to the South African second division. In 2013, Sekola signed for Free State Stars in the South African top flight, where he made 101 appearances and scored 21 goals. He was the top scorer of the 2014–15 South African Premier Division with 14 goals. Before the second half of 2017/18, Sekola signed for South African second division club Highlands Park, helping them earn promotion to the South African top flight.

References

External links
 
 Moeketsi Sekola at playmakerstats.com

Living people
South African soccer players
Association football forwards
1989 births
South African Premier Division players
National First Division players
Roses United F.C. players
Free State Stars F.C. players
Chippa United F.C. players
Highlands Park F.C. players
Real Kings F.C. players
Jomo Cosmos F.C. players